Gentleman's Agreement is a 1947 American drama film based on Laura Z. Hobson's best-selling 1947 novel of the same title. It concerns a journalist (played by Gregory Peck) who poses as a Jew to research an exposé on the widespread anti-Semitism in New York City and the affluent communities of New Canaan and Darien, Connecticut. It was nominated for eight Academy Awards and won three: Best Picture, Best Supporting Actress (Celeste Holm), and Best Director (Elia Kazan).

The movie was controversial in its day, as was a similar film on the same subject, Crossfire, which was released the same year (though that film was originally a story about anti-homosexuality, later changed to anti-Semitism).

In 2017, the film was selected for preservation in the United States National Film Registry by the Library of Congress as being "culturally, historically, or aesthetically significant".

Plot

Philip Schuyler Green is a widowed journalist who has just moved to New York City with his son Tommy and mother. Phil meets with magazine publisher John Minify, who asks Green, a Gentile, to write an article on anti-Semitism. He is not very enthusiastic about the story at first.

At a lunch party, Phil meets Minify's niece Kathy Lacey, who turns out to be the person who suggested the story idea. The next day, he tries to explain anti-Jewish prejudice to his son – directly after displaying some anti-female prejudice. Phil tells his mother that he was surprised after learning that the article came from "a girl". His mother mocks him for this. Phil is then inspired to write the story after having the difficulty explaining the topic to his son.

Phil and Kathy begin dating and Phil adopts a Jewish identity to write the story from a fresh perspective. They agree to keep it secret that Phil is not Jewish. Though Kathy seems to have liberal views, she is taken aback after learning of Phil's plan.

At the magazine, Phil is assigned a secretary, Elaine Wales. She turns out to be Jewish, but changed her name to get the job. After Phil informs Minify about Wales' experience, Minify orders the magazine to adopt hiring policies that are open to Jews. Phil meets fashion editor Anne Dettrey, who becomes a good friend and potentially more, particularly as strains develop between Phil and Kathy.

Dave Goldman, Phil’s childhood friend, moves to New York for a job and lives with the Greens while looking for a home for his family. Dave is Jewish and also experiences anti-Semitism. Housing is scarce in the city, but it is particularly difficult for Dave, since not all landlords will rent to a Jewish family.

As Phil researches his story, he experiences several incidents of bigotry. When his mother becomes ill with a heart condition, the doctor discourages him from consulting a specialist with an obviously Jewish name. After hearing Phil is Jewish, the doctor becomes uncomfortable and leaves. In addition, the janitor is shocked to see that a Jewish name is listed on the mail box. Furthermore, when Phil wants to celebrate his honeymoon at a swanky hotel, the manager refuses to register Phil and tells him to go to a different hotel instead. Tommy also becomes the target of bullies because of this. Phil is troubled by the way Kathy consoles Tommy, telling him their taunts of "dirty Jew" are wrong because he isn't Jewish, not that the epithet is wrong in and of itself.

Kathy's attitudes are revealed further when she and Phil announce their engagement. Her sister Jane invites them to a celebration in her home in Darien, which is known to be a community where Jews are not welcome. Fearing an awkward scene, Kathy wants to tell her family and friends that Phil is only pretending to be a Jew, but he dissuades her. At the party, everyone is very friendly to Phil, though many people are "unable" to attend at the last minute.

Dave announces that he will have to quit his job because he cannot find a residence for his family. Kathy owns a vacant cottage in Darien and Phil sees it as the obvious solution to Dave's problem. Kathy, however, is unwilling to offend her neighbors by renting it to a Jewish family. Phil breaks his engagement to her and announces that he will be moving away from New York when his article is published. When it comes out, it is very well received by the magazine staff.

Kathy meets with Dave and tells him how sick she felt when a party guest told a bigoted joke. However, she has no answer when Dave asks her what she did about it. She realizes that remaining silent condones the prejudice. The next day, Dave tells Phil that he and his family will be moving into the cottage in Darien and Kathy will be moving in with her sister next door to make sure they are treated well. When Phil hears this, he reconciles with Kathy.

Cast

Other cast members

Production
Zanuck decided to make a film version of Hobson's novel after being refused membership in the Los Angeles Country Club, because it was assumed (incorrectly) that he was Jewish. Before filming commenced, Samuel Goldwyn and other Jewish film executives approached Darryl Zanuck and asked him not to make the film, fearing it would "stir up trouble". They also warned that Hays Code enforcer Joseph Breen might not allow the film to pass the censors, as he had been known to make disparaging remarks about Jews. There was also concern that Dorothy McGuire's character being divorced would offend the National Legion of Decency.

The role of Phillip Green was first offered to Cary Grant, but he turned it down. Peck decided to accept the role, although his agent advised him to refuse, believing Peck would be endangering his career. Jewish actor John Garfield agreed to play a lesser role in the film to be a part of it.

Portions of the film were shot on location in Darien, Connecticut.

Reception and box-office
Gentleman's Agreement received a generally favorable reception from influential New York Times critic Bosley Crowther. Crowther said that "every point about prejudice which Miss Hobson had to make in her book has been made with superior illustration and more graphic demonstration in the film, so that the sweep of her moral indignation is not only widened, but intensified thereby". However, Crowther also said that the movie shared the novel's failings in that "explorations are narrowly confined to the upper-class social and professional level to which he is immediately exposed". He also said the main character's shock at the extent of anti-Semitism was lacking in credibility: "It is, in a careful analysis, an extraordinarily naive role." On Rotten Tomatoes, the film has an aggregate score of 82% based on 67 positive and 15 negative critic reviews. The website's consensus reads: "It occasionally fails to live up to its subject matter -- and is perhaps an 'important' film more than a 'great' one -- but the performances from Gregory Peck and Dorothy McGuire are superb."

The New York Herald Tribune described it as a "brilliant blow against racial and religious intolerance".The Daily Mirror assessed it as "the most explosive picture of the year" and "one of the most exciting and punch-laden pictures you've ever seen."

In addition to winning Academy Awards for Best Picture, Best Director, and Best Supporting Actress (Celeste Holm), Gentleman's Agreement was one of Fox's highest-grossing movies of 1947. The political nature of the film, however, upset the House Un-American Activities Committee, with Elia Kazan, Darryl Zanuck, John Garfield, and Anne Revere all being called to testify before the committee. Revere refused to testify and although Garfield appeared, he refused to "name names". Both were placed in the Red Channels of the Hollywood Blacklist. Garfield remained on the blacklist for a year, was called again to testify against his wife, and died of a heart attack at the age of 39 before his second hearing date.

In recognition for producing Gentleman's Agreement, the Hollywood chapter of B'nai B'rith International honored Darryl Zanuck as its "Man of the Year" for 1948. On Sunday, December 12, a gala commemoration evening was held in downtown Los Angeles at the Biltmore Hotel before a crowd of over a thousand. Among the tributes to Zanuck, New Mexico Senator Clinton Anderson said, "He does not storm up and down the streets of a community, urging its citizens to do good. He does not fill the pages of books with words that string together into a sermon. He allows you to be seated comfortably in a theater, to be absorbed in a problem and to walk out into the night with your thoughts clarified and your lips saying, 'This situation ought to be changed'." After the formal speeches there was a star-studded variety show, including the debut before the Hollywood film world of the team of Dean Martin and Jerry Lewis.

The movie was an unexpected hit at the box office. According to Variety, it earned $3.9 million in rentals in the US in 1948.

Leonard Maltin said "sincere...then daring approach to the subject matter is tame now."

Awards and nominations

See also
 Black Like Me (1964)
 Guess Who's Coming to Dinner (1967)

References

External links

 
 
 
 
 

1947 films
1947 drama films
20th Century Fox films
American drama films
Antisemitism in the United States
Best Drama Picture Golden Globe winners
Best Picture Academy Award winners
American black-and-white films
Films about journalists
Films directed by Elia Kazan
Films featuring a Best Supporting Actress Academy Award-winning performance
Films featuring a Best Supporting Actress Golden Globe-winning performance
Films set in Connecticut
Films set in New York City
Films whose director won the Best Directing Academy Award
Films whose director won the Best Director Golden Globe
Films scored by Alfred Newman
Films produced by Darryl F. Zanuck
Films about antisemitism
United States National Film Registry films
1940s English-language films
1940s American films